The Chalk Ministry was the 38th ministry of the Government of Queensland and was led by Liberal Party Premier Gordon Chalk. It succeeded the Pizzey Ministry on 2 August 1968 following Pizzey's unexpected death on 31 July, and was sworn in by Governor Alan Mansfield as a temporary measure until the Country Party, the dominant coalition partner, could elect a leader. It did so and on 8 August 1968, Joh Bjelke-Petersen became leader and Premier of Queensland, and the Bjelke-Petersen Ministry was constituted.

Blue entries indicate members of the Liberal Party, while the others were members of the Country Party.

References
 
 

Queensland ministries